Megan Fonteno (born 5 March 1993 in Okinawa, Japan) is an American Samoan professional swimmer. She qualified for the 2012 Summer Olympics in London at the 100 m freestyle event. She came 26th in the world.

References

External links
 

Olympic swimmers of American Samoa
American female swimmers
American Samoan female swimmers
American people of Samoan descent
Swimmers at the 2012 Summer Olympics
Living people
1993 births
People from Okinawa Island